Branko Grčić (born 16 April 1964) is a Croatian politician and economist. In 1987 he graduated on the Faculty of Economics in the University of Split. He got his master's degree in economics in 1990 and received a Doctorate on the same university in 1996. Since 2005 he had been a regular professor and later became Dean of the Faculty of Economics in Split. He has published over 60 scientific works focusing on macroeconomics and regional economics. He is a member of the Croatian branch of the European Regional Science Association. From December 23, 2011, to January 22, 2016, he has been the Deputy Prime Minister and Minister of Regional Development and EU Funds in the centre left Cabinet of Zoran Milanović.

References

External links

1964 births
Government ministers of Croatia
Social Democratic Party of Croatia politicians
People from Knin
20th-century Croatian economists
Regional economists
Serbs of Croatia
University of Split alumni
Living people
Representatives in the modern Croatian Parliament
21st-century Croatian economists